Karen Morton is a female British sport shooter.

Sport shooting career
Morton represented England and won two silver medals in the 10 metres air rifle pairs with Louise Minett and the 50 metres three-position rifle pairs with Lindsay Volpin, at the 1994 Commonwealth Games in Victoria, British Columbia, Canada. Four years later she represented England in the 50 metres three-position rifle events, at the 1998 Commonwealth Games in Kuala Lumpur, Malaysia.

References

Living people
Year of birth missing (living people)
British female sport shooters
Commonwealth Games medallists in shooting
Commonwealth Games silver medallists for England
Shooters at the 1994 Commonwealth Games
Shooters at the 1998 Commonwealth Games
20th-century British women
Medallists at the 1994 Commonwealth Games